Maatho Pettukoku is a 1995 Indian Telugu-language action film produced by S. Gopal Reddy under the Bhargav Art Productions banner and directed by A. Kodandarami Reddy. The film stars Nandamuri Balakrishna, Roja and Rambha, with music composed by Madhavapeddi Suresh.

Plot
The film begins in the town Sitanagaram where Sitamma a benevolent daughter-in-law of a Zamindar whom he gives the utmost priority. She leads delightful life with her husband and the two identical children Arjun & Kishtaiah. Chakravarthy a malice son-in-law intrudes on the mercy of Sitamma and slays Zamindar & his son and grabs their riches. Thus, Sitamma pledges to avenge Chakravarthy until she will not disperse her husband's ashes. Suddenly, Chakravarthy strikes which detaches all. 

Years roll by, and Kishtaiah is reared by a bold woman Manikyam who becomes a pickpocket. Once he squabbles with a naughty girl Latha the daughter of Chakravarthy’s sidekick Mayor Geedapenta Basavaiah. After a series of donnybrooks, he crushes on her. Besides, Arjun turns into a stout-hearted cop and intentionally makes his posting to Sitanagaram. Wherefore, Bhavani venomous son of Chakravarthy conducts various trafficking & torts and suppresses law & order under his toe. Upon arrival, Arjun acquainted with a handywoman Lakshmi and falls for her. In the interim, Latha back to her hometown Kishtaiah shadows her. Therefrom, a confusing drama arises which ends hilariously. Sitamma resides at a temple in an insane state carrying her husband's ashes and waiting for her children to seek vengeance. Kishtaiah comes across her and an unknown bondage relates to them. 

Forthwith, Arjun battles & destroys the Bhavani dynasty. Plus, seizes him under false allegation as a murder convict. Being conscious of it, Chakravarthy lands from abroad to rescue his son and challenges Arjun to acquit his son. However, Arjun strikes back with his wit and blocks all the roads. So, Chakravarthy bribes a wicked cop SI Venkata Rao to free his son. Here, Arjun tactically forces Bhavani to kill Venkata Rao and encounters him while he is absconding. Infuriated Chakravarthy roars at Arjun when he reveals his identity and vows to ruin him. 

At that point, Chakravarthy gazes the existence of two alike persons. Hence, he lures Kishtaiah to fulfill his longing to knit Latha and ruses to assassinate Basavaiah via him to incriminate Arjun. At a public function, when Kishtaiah is about to shoot Mayor Sitamma fires on Chakravarthy and apprehends her. Learning it, Kishtaiah bails her out in the guise of Arjun when Manikyam discerns and declares Kishtaiah as Sitamma's son. Meanwhile, Arjun detects Sitamma's bag and recognizes her by the ashes & family photo in it. Next, the mother & children unite. At last, Arjun & Kishtaiah ceases Chakravarthy and immerses their father’s ashes. Finally, the movie ends on a happy note with the marriage of Arjun to Lakshmi & Kishtaiah to Latha.

Cast

Nandamuri Balakrishna as SP Arjun & Kishtayya (Dual role)
Roja as Latha
Rambha as Lakshmi
Captain Raju as Chakravarthy
Raghuvaran as Bhavani
Kota Srinivasa Rao as Mayor Geedapenta Basavayya
Babu Mohan as Hanumanthu
Giri Babu as Head Constable
Rallapalli as Writer 
Ahuti Prasad as the father of the lead characters
Ramalinga Raju as the grandfather of the lead characters
Chinna as Inspector 
Vinod as S.I. Venkatrao 
Sakshi Ranga Rao as Rishawala
Garimalla Viswaswara Rao as Kishtayya's henchman
Gautam Raju as Kishtayya's henchman
KK Sarma as Lawyer Pichaiah Chowdary
Juttu Narasimham as Chilaka Jyothishikudu
Dham
Sujatha as Seetamma
Varalakshmi as Shanti
Disco Shanthi as item number
Kalpana Rai as Hostel Warden
Y. Vijaya as Manikyam
Master Baladitya as Young Arjun

Soundtrack

Music composed by Madhavapeddi Suresh. Music released on Supreme Music Company.

References

External links

1995 films
Films directed by A. Kodandarami Reddy
1990s Telugu-language films